Jumbo King is a chain of fast food restaurants based primarily in Mumbai, Maharashtra specialising in the Maharashtrian regional dish vada pav (though later sold as vegetarian burgers). Established in 2001 by husband and wife Dheeraj and Reeta Gupta, the company was inspired by the fast food business model of McDonald's and Burger King. Jumbo King Foods Pvt. Ltd. is a franchisee-based company that operates across many areas of India. From its beginnings in Malad, a suburb of Mumbai, it has spread across the whole Mumbai Metropolitan Region (MMR), as well as Bengaluru, Hyderabad, Indore, Lucknow, Aurangabad, Delhi and Gujarat.

History
An earlier franchisee of Burger King, the Guptas, on their visit to London, realised that fast food could also work in India. Vada pav was their first idea, as the food had to be portable. The outlet was initially named Chaat Factory (Snack Factory), and vada pav was sold at 5, despite street vendors selling the same product for 2. The name was later changed to Jumbo King. Gupta faced opposition from his family, who thought he was wasting his MBA by selling vada pavs.

Vada pav is a popular vegetarian dish native to the Indian state of Maharashtra, although it has been losing its reputation in past few years. The places where the food is now cooked and sold are often polluted, and it is considered a "poor man's food". The people of Mumbai and Thane consume about 18–20 lakh (1.8–2 million) units of vada pav, with stiff competition mainly from the street vendors in the city.

As of 2010, the chain had 30 outlets in Mumbai, selling an average of 40,000 vada pavs every day, priced between 10 and 80 a piece. As of August 2017, the chain now has above 300 outlets across various parts of India.

It repositioned itself as an Indian burger brand in 2015. Jumbo King launched a range of burgers, such as corn and spinach, crispy veggie and mac and cheese.

Timeline
 2001: First outlet of the chain at Malad in Mumbai was opened on 23 August 2001.
 2003: Second outlet in Kandivali, Malad.
 2007: Received Award for New Concept Franchising and Award as Innovative Franchisee model.
 Two outlets were opened in Ahmedabad on 17 August 2007.
 2011: First outlet in Bangalore at Koramangala.
 2014: First outlet in Hyderabad at Narayanguda.

Menu
A Jumbo King vada pav consists of a batata vada (a spicy deep-fried potato patty) in a pav (bread roll), similar in size and shape to a Quarter Pounder. Jumbo King is considered Mumbai's first branded vada pav, and is the largest selling brand.
The pav used by Jumbo King was designed by Salim Malik, who dropped out of college to help run his father's bakery. Thanks to work with Jumbo King, their bakery has become the largest dealer of pavs in Borivali. They offer Lassi, a popular and traditional yogurt-based drink of the Indian subcontinent, as well as Pepsi products.

Currently, Jumbo King offers several variations of the vada pav, that include unique schezwan sauce, as well as different patties such as corn and peas, corn and spinach, crunchy vegetables, salted fries, thick shakes and sundaes.

References

Restaurants established in 2001
Fast-food chains of India
Fast-food franchises
Indian brands
Brand name snack foods